The Soviet Cup was a rugby union club competition between the domestic teams of the Soviet Union era. The first competition was held in 1976, and continued on an annual basis until 1990.

Results

Results by republic

See also
 Soviet Championship
 Professional Rugby League

External links
 Soviet Era of rugby union

Cup
Recurring sporting events established in 1976
Recurring events disestablished in 1990
1976 establishments in the Soviet Union
Defunct rugby union competitions in Europe
Defunct rugby union cup competitions